Duhig is a surname. Notable people with the surname include:

Christina Duhig, American poet
Ian Duhig (born 1954), British poet
James Duhig (1873–1965), Irish-born Australian Roman Catholic bishop
James Vincent Duhig (1889–1963), Australian pathologist
Michael Duhig (1953–2010), Canadian actor and radio host